Final Four to be played from 18–19 March 2017 in Podgorica, Montenegro.

Semifinals

For third place

Final

Bracket

References

External links
Official website

Final Four